Alexis Kerry Ohanian (born April 24, 1983) is an American internet entrepreneur and investor. He is best known as the co-founder and executive chairman of the social media site Reddit along with Steve Huffman and Aaron Swartz. He also co-founded the early-stage venture capital firm Initialized Capital, helped launch the travel search website Hipmunk, and started the social enterprise Breadpig. He was also a partner at Y Combinator.

Ohanian is based in Florida, where he lives with his wife, tennis player Serena Williams, and their daughter, Alexis Olympia Ohanian.

, Forbes estimated Ohanian’s net worth as $70 million.

Early life
Alexis Kerry Ohanian was born in Brooklyn, New York. His paternal grandparents came to the United States as refugees. Ohanian's mother was from Germany. He went to Howard High School in Ellicott City, Maryland, where he gave the student address for his graduating class in 2001.

Career
Ohanian says his obsession with technology started in middle school when he got a 33.6k dialup modem. He spent time on message boards learning how to code and build websites. Eventually he began to make websites for nonprofit organizations for free, by "trick[ing]" them, hiding behind his email to disguise the fact that he was a teen doing this from his parent's basement.

After graduating from the University of Virginia in 2005 with degrees in commerce and history, Ohanian and friend Steve Huffman pitched the idea MyMobileMenu to Y Combinator. The company passed on the idea but encouraged the duo to come up with another idea it could potentially fund. They later came up with reddit.com with the goal of it becoming the "front page of the Internet".

Reddit joined Y-Combinator's first batch of start-ups in the summer of 2005 and was later acquired by Condé Nast in 2006 for an undisclosed amount between $10 million and $20 million. Ohanian continued to work closely with Reddit as a member of its board of directors. Ohanian returned to Reddit full-time with co-founder Huffman in July 2015 to lead the now-independent company. He stepped back from the company in February 2018 to return to focusing on investing.

In 2007, Ohanian launched Breadpig, an "uncorporation" that produces geeky merchandise and gives the proceeds to charity. As of 2012, he is no longer involved in the day-to-day operations of Breadpig.

In 2009, Ohanian spoke at TED about a whale named Mister Splashy Pants. After leaving Reddit in 2010, Ohanian spent three months working in microfinance as a Kiva fellow in Yerevan, Armenia. Ohanian helped launch travel search website Hipmunk in 2010 and now acts as an adviser. In June 2010, Ohanian announced the launch of his company Das Kapital Capital, which focuses on start-up investing, advising, and consulting.

Ohanian was given the title "Ambassador to the East" by the early-stage venture firm Y Combinator. In this position, he meets with East Coast applicants, mentors New York YC founders, and is a general representative for the company. He also held the role of part-time partner and full-time partner at Y Combinator before leaving in 2016 to help launch the third Initialized Capital fund with Garry Tan.

On June 5, 2020, Ohanian resigned from Reddit's board, asking to be replaced by a black candidate in response to the murder of George Floyd. On June 10, 2020, it was announced that Michael Seibel, an African-American entrepreneur, was named a Reddit board member.

On July 21, 2020, Ohanian was announced as the lead investor in a primarily female group that was awarded a new franchise in the National Women's Soccer League, the top level of the sport for women in the U.S. The new team, later unveiled as Angel City FC, started playing in 2022. The ownership group, in which women hold a majority interest, includes 14 former members of the U.S. women's national team, Oscar-winning actor Natalie Portman, and many other prominent actors, entertainers, media personalities, and sportspeople, among them Ohanian's wife, Serena Williams.

In June 2020, Ohanian ended his role as Managing Partner at Initialized. In June 2021, Ohanian announced a new venture capital firm he is leading, named "776".

Early-stage tech investing 
Ohanian co-founded Initialized Capital in 2010 and made seed investments in start-ups including Instacart, Zenefits, Opendoor, and Cruise. It has had three funds, totaling over $500 million under management. In 2014, CB Insights analyzed all the investors in tech, ranking Ohanian number one for network centrality, the breadth of connections an investor has with other investors in the ecosystem, and the quality and depth of those links.

Through Initialized Capital, Ohanian invested $3 million in childcare start-up Kinside in 2019. In 2020, Ohanian also invested $4 million in Dispo (David's Disposable).

In April 2021, Ohanian invested $10 million into social startup pearpop in a Series A round, alongside $6 million coming from other investors including Bessemer Venture Partners, Sound Ventures, Slow Ventures and other celebrities.

Open Internet activism
In late 2010 and early 2011, Ohanian spoke out against Congress's Stop Online Piracy Act and the Senate's PROTECT IP Act. He helped lead the Internet-enabled campaign that eventually overturned the two bills. Ohanian spoke to members of Congress, helped launch the national anti-SOPA/PIPA protests that took place on January 18, 2012, and spoke at the rally in New York that was organized by NY Tech Meetup.

In October 2012, Ohanian teamed up with Reddit General Manager Erik Martin and embarked on the Internet 2012 Bus Tour from Denver, Colorado, to Danville, Kentucky, to campaign for the open Internet during the presidential and vice presidential debates. One of the campaign stops spurred the idea for a possible "National Geek Day" in Washington, D.C.

In response to his work advocating for an Open Internet, The Daily Dot named Ohanian number one in their top 10 most influential activists of 2012, and Forbes Magazine dubbed him "Mayor of the Internet".

In May 2014, Ohanian began lobbying the FCC to support net neutrality, culminating with a day-long phone-a-thon into the FCC and Congress on January 15, 2015.

Victoria Taylor firing
On July 2, 2015, Reddit fired communications director Victoria Taylor, an administrator who coordinated celebrity interviews from Reddit's New York office. In protest, volunteer moderators of the IAmA community set their forum to private, effectively turning it off, and other volunteer moderators followed suit because of "anger at the way the company routinely demands that the volunteers and community accept major changes that reduce [their] efficiency and increase [their] workload." The following day, a moderator of IAmA posted that "Chooter (Victoria) was let go as an admin by u/kn0thing [Alexis Ohanian]," an assertion that was not widely reported on. Media outlets such as Variety blamed interim CEO Ellen Pao for the dismissal. Harassment, which was already being directed toward Pao in relation to other controversies, intensified and she resigned a week later. However, on July 12, former CEO Yishan Wong informed the Reddit community that Taylor was fired by "the CEO's boss" and accused Ohanian of scapegoating. In the aftermath of Pao's resignation, Ohanian elaborated on his role in Taylor's dismissal, countering that even though the AMA/IAmA changes came from him, he still reported to Pao. In 2017, Pao criticized Ohanian for avoiding the fallout by attending Wimbledon in the days immediately following Taylor's firing.

Creative work

Ohanian has created all the mascots for the companies he started: Reddit alien "Snoo", Breadpig pig with bread wings, Hipmunk chipmunk "Chip", and Initialized Capital honey badger.

Hijab emoji project 
In early 2017, he worked with teenager Rayouf Alhumedhi to campaign for a hijab emoji. Ohanian helped arrange an AMA for Alhumedhi on r/twoxchromosomes about her idea and responded to critics. On July 17, 2017, Apple released its version of the hijab emoji.

Crowdfunding campaigns
On December 10, 2012, Ohanian teamed up with Lester Chambers of The Chambers Brothers to launch a Kickstarter project, with the intent to make a new album entitled "Lester's Time Has Come". According to Fast Company, Ohanian aimed "to prove that there are new, sustainable funding opportunities for artists now thanks to platforms like Kickstarter." This project raised over $61,000 for Chambers.

Two years later, Ohanian raised $12,244 for the non-profit Black Girls Code on Tilt.com. In May 2014, Ohanian used Tilt.com again to launch "Save Net Neutrality: Billboard in FCC's Backyard", a crowdfunding campaign to protest the FCC's plans to eliminate the idea of net neutrality.

Visiting Armenia on the occasion of the 100th anniversary of the Armenian genocide, in April 2015, Ohanian toured Children of Armenia Fund (COAF)-supported villages in rural Armenia.

Advocate for paternity leave
Following the birth of his daughter, Ohanian became an advocate of paternity leave and wrote an article about his experience following his daughter's birth in the New York Times. "After my wife nearly died giving birth, I spent months at home caring for my family". In June 2019, Ohanian announced his plans to bring the pledge to lawmakers on Capitol Hill in late 2019 in a push to pass federal paid family leave legislation. He stated that "I hope to be meeting with many senators, representatives, plenty of dads, on both sides of the aisle, in both houses of the Legislature, who want this to be the law of the land."

Personal life
On December 29, 2016, Ohanian became engaged to tennis player Serena Williams. Their daughter, Alexis Olympia Ohanian, was born on September 1, 2017, in West Palm Beach, Florida. Ohanian and Williams married on November 16, 2017, in New Orleans. Ohanian has said that "watching Williams compete has changed how he measures success in business." Ohanian and Williams gave their daughter a doll, called Qai Qai, which has become famous on social media.

Awards and honors
In 2011 and 2012, Ohanian was named to the Forbes "30 Under 30" list as an important figure in the technology industry. In 2013, Ohanian and Erik Martin were featured as "champions of innovation" in the 20th Anniversary issue of Wired. In 2015, Ohanian was named to the Crain's "40 Under 40" list for business. In 2016, Ohanian was named one of Fast Company's "Most Creative People in Business".

On May 21, 2020, Ohanian delivered the Commencement address for The Johns Hopkins University Class of 2020.

In December 2022, Ohanian was named a 2023 Money Changemaker by the Money magazine.

In the media

Published works
Ohanian published a book titled Without Their Permission: How the 21st Century Will Be Made, Not Managed on October 1, 2013. Without Their Permission ranked fourth on The Wall Street Journals best sellers list for Hardcover Business. In connection with the book, Ohanian embarked on a five-month, 150-stop and 75-university tour to promote the book.

Small Empires
In the summer of 2013, Small Empires with Alexis Ohanian, a weekly online series focused on rising startups in New York City hosted by Ohanian, premiered on The Verge. The first season ran for nine episodes. The second season premiered in October 2014.

Podcasts

Business Dad
From businessdad.initialized.com, January 2020: “In a new podcast from Initialized Capital, Alexis Ohanian (cofounder of Initialized + Reddit) opens this question up to some of the most successful men across business, sports, entertainment, and more, for candid conversations about what it means to be a father in today’s world and how they balance their careers and family.”

NYRD Radio
On October 15, 2014, Ohanian launched the NYRD Radio podcast. Guests on the show have included Tim Ferriss, James Altucher, Carter Cleveland (founder of Artsy) and Cameron Russell. The podcast features a segment called Office Hours, in which aspiring entrepreneurs can apply to work through an idea with him.

Upvoted
On January 8, 2015, Ohanian released the first episode – listed as "Episode 0" – of Reddit's new podcast Upvoted, in which Ohanian delves deeper into real stories found on Reddit and talks to the users involved. Each week, the podcast focuses on a different story and features a guest around whom that story is centered.

Other Media

Twitch (@AOC) 
Ohanian was featured on a livestream broadcast on January 28, 2021 on Twitch. The livestream was streamed on Alexandria Ocasio-Cortez's channel. The stream featured various other people like TheStockGuy and Alexis Goldstein. During the stream guests spoke about their opinions on the Gamestop Short Squeeze.

Tools of Titans 
Ohanian has a chapter giving advice in Tim Ferriss' book Tools of Titans.

See also 
 Lester Chambers
 Children of Armenia Fund
 Breadpig
 Howard High School
 University of Virginia

References

External links 

 
 

American computer businesspeople
American Internet celebrities
American people of Armenian descent
American people of German descent
American technology chief executives
Angel City FC owners
Businesspeople from New York City
Living people
People from Brooklyn
Private equity and venture capital investors
McIntire School of Commerce alumni
1983 births
American technology company founders
Reddit people
Activists from New York (state)
Y Combinator people
Venture capitalists